Nick Banyard (born February 16, 1994) is an American professional basketball player for Anórthosis Ammóchostou of the Greek Basket League. He played college basketball for New Mexico, Illinois State, and UCF.

High school career 
Banyard attended Edward S. Marcus High School in Flower Mound, Texas, playing basketball alongside top recruit and future National Basketball Association (NBA) player Marcus Smart. He won two state titles and earned all-district and second-team all-state honors in his senior season.

College career 
Banyard played sparingly in his first two seasons with New Mexico. On November 21, 2013, in his second year, he scored a season-high 9 points versus UAB. Banyard later blamed his own laziness for his lack of production at New Mexico. After his sophomore season, he transferred to Illinois State to join a coach he could "trust." Banyard was sidelined for one season due to NCAA transfer rules. During that time, he missed one month of practice because of a heart issue, but doctors soon allowed him to continue playing. As a junior, Banyard averaged 5.2 points and 4.3 rebounds per game. On February 11, 2016, he scored a season-best 18 points in a 70–60 win over Evansville. At the end of the season, he was named to the Missouri Valley Conference All-Bench Team. For his senior campaign, Banyard transferred to UCF, where he averaged 6.2 points and 6 rebounds in 28.4 minutes per game.

Professional career 
On August 29, 2017, Banyard signed with Aomori Wat's of the Japanese B.League. Through 17 games, he averaged 8.3 points, 3.3 rebounds, and 1.8 assists in 19.1 minutes per game. Banyard finished the 2017–18 season with Rayos de Hermosillo of the Circuito de Baloncesto de la Costa del Pacífico (CIBACOPA) in Mexico, signing as an import player on March 27, 2018. Through 9 games, he averaged 12.9 points, 6.8 rebounds, and 1.1 assists per game. On October 8, 2018, Banyard signed with the St. John's Edge for the 2018–19 season. He was released after training camp.

During the 2020–21 season, Banyard played for Korihait of the Korisliiga and averaged 7.9 points and 6.9 rebounds per game. On April 27, 2021. he signed with AMIB Casablanca. During the summer of 2021, Banyard joined GIE Maile Matrix of the United Cup league and averaged 12.5 points and 9.0 rebounds per game. He signed with KB Rahoveci of the Kosovo Basketball Superleague at the beginning of the 2021–22 season and averaged 21.2 points, 11.7 rebounds and 1.2 assists per game. On November 2, Banyard signed with Anórthosis Ammóchostou of the Cypriot league.

Personal life 
Banyard is the brother of National Football League (NFL) player Joe Banyard.

References 

1994 births
Living people
New Mexico Lobos men's basketball players
Illinois State Redbirds men's basketball players
UCF Knights men's basketball players
Rayos de Hermosillo players
Aomori Wat's players
People from Flower Mound, Texas
American expatriate basketball people in Finland
American expatriate basketball people in Kosovo
American expatriate basketball people in Mexico
American expatriate basketball people in Portugal
American men's basketball players
Forwards (basketball)